Joseph Alan Willis (born 3 October 2001) is an English footballer who plays as a midfielder for Stafford Rangers.

Career
Born in Walsall, Willis started his career at Walsall and made his debut for the club on 7 January 2020, coming on as a second-half substitute in a 2–1 EFL Trophy defeat at home to Portsmouth. On 13 February 2020, he joined Salisbury on a one-month loan, and made two appearances for the club. He was offered his first professional contract for Walsall in May 2020, and signed his first professional contract with the club in July 2020. He made his league debut for Walsall on 24 April 2021 as a late substitute in a 2–0 victory away to Scunthorpe United, and made his second appearance of the season as a substitute in the final match of the season against Carlisle United.

In October 2021, Willis joined National League North side Leamington on a month-long youth loan. On 19 November 2021, Willis was recalled from his loan spell by parent club Walsall. On the same day Willis was loaned out to Southern League Premier Central side Bromsgrove Sporting. Willis made a total of 26 appearances whilst on loan with Bromsgrove Sporting.

Willis was released at the end of the 2021–22 season. Upon his release, Willis joined Northern Premier League Premier Division club Stafford Rangers.

Career statistics

References

External links
 
 
 

2001 births
Living people
English footballers
Sportspeople from Walsall
Association football midfielders
Walsall F.C. players
Salisbury F.C. players
Leamington F.C. players
Bromsgrove Sporting F.C. players
Stafford Rangers F.C. players
English Football League players
National League (English football) players
Southern Football League players